Parliamentary elections were held in Albania on 26 May 1996, with a second round of voting for 25 seats on 2 June. The result was a victory for the ruling Democratic Party of Albania, which won 122 of the 140 seats. Voter turnout was 89.1%.

On the day of the first round of voting, six opposition parties led by the Socialist Party of Albania withdrew from the election, accusing the Democratic Party of intimidation. International observers noted that the elections were marred by "a number of irregularities and technical shortcomings" and concluded that the election "did not meet international standards for free and fair elections", nor the standards of Albanian law. After the first round results were released on 29 May, the Socialist Party of Albania announced that they would not take up their seats in the National Assembly. Almost all opposition parties boycotted the second round as a result.

Results

References

Parliamentary elections in Albania
Albania
1996 elections in Albania
1996 in Albania
May 1996 events in Europe
Election and referendum articles with incomplete results